

The Dayton-Wright FP.2 was a forestry patrol aircraft developed in the United States in the early 1920s for use by the Canadian Forest Service. It was a twin-engine two-bay biplane with equal-span, unstaggered wings that were designed to be interchangeable between top and bottom. Initially designed with the props in a pusher position, the engines were remounted in tractor position before the aircraft went into service. The cabin was fully enclosed and seated four, with the single pilot in an extensively glazed nose. The empennage had triple fins, and the landing gear consisted of twin pontoons. Only a single example was built. While in service the aircraft was modified with larger side windows, and controls for a second pilot.

Operators

Canadian Forest Service

Specifications

References

 
 aerofiles.com

1920s United States special-purpose aircraft
FP.2
Floatplanes
Biplanes
Aircraft first flown in 1921
Twin piston-engined tractor aircraft